Durok  is a village in the administrative district of Gmina Siechnice, within Wrocław County, Lower Silesian Voivodeship, in south-western Poland. Prior to 1945 it was in Germany.

The village is one of the place that suffered during the great flood in 1997.

References

Durok